Kożuchów may refer to the following places:
Kożuchów in Lubusz Voivodeship (west Poland)
Kożuchów, Białobrzegi County in Masovian Voivodeship (east-central Poland)
Kożuchów, Subcarpathian Voivodeship (south-east Poland)
Kożuchów, Sokołów County in Masovian Voivodeship (east-central Poland)